Dirty Tiger, Crazy Frog is a 1978 Hong Kong martial arts comedy film directed by Karl Maka, who also wrote the screenplay with Eric Tsang, produced with Sammo Hung and Lau Kar-wing, who both starred in the lead roles. The film was one of two (along with Odd Couple) produced by Gar Bo Motion Picture Company, a company formed by Hung, Maka and Lau created.

The film also features cameos from Yuen Biao, Lam Ching-ying and Hsiao Ho.

Cast
 Sammo Hung as Frog
 Lau Kar-wing as Tiger
 Jason Pai as Smiling Tiger
 Meg Lam as Muti hand chick
 Dean Shek as Panther
 Hoi Sang Lee as White Brow Monk
 Karl Maka as Sheriff
 To Siu-ming as 3 Trick Kid
 Lam Ching-ying as One of Panther's men
 Chin Yuet-sang as Chicken
 Chung Fat as Chicken's blood brother
 Yuen Biao as Casino fighter
 Cheng Kang-yeh as Coffin King
 Fung King-man as Casino dealer
 Hung Chan-nei
 Fung Hak-on as Pimp
 Mars as 3 Trick Kid's partner
 Alan Chui Chung-San as Man getting pickpocketed at casino
 Hsiao Ho as One of Panther's men
 Huang Ha as Chicken's blood brother
 Billy Chan as One of Panther's men
 Peter Chan as One of Panther's men
 Tsang Choh-lam as Innkeeper
 Mang Hoi as Casino fighter
 Lam Hak-ming as Casino fighter
 Johnny Cheung as One of Coffin King's men
 Lau Ka-yung as One of Coffin King's men
 Ho Pak-kwong as Casino manager
 Chan Lap-ban as Frog's wife
 Pan Yung-sheng as Casino fighter
 Fong Ping
 Hui Ying-ying
 Yeung Sai-kwan
 Law Keung
 Lai Kim-hung
 Siu Tak-foo
 Lee Chun-wa
 Shing Wan-on
 Chiu Siu-po
 Ho Chi-wai as One of Coffin King's men

External links 
 Dirty Tiger, Crazy Frog at Hong Kong Cinemagic
 
 

1978 films
1978 martial arts films
1970s martial arts comedy films
1970s Cantonese-language films
Films shot in Hong Kong
Hong Kong martial arts comedy films
Kung fu films
1970s Hong Kong films